Woodlyn is a census-designated place (CDP) in Delaware County, Pennsylvania, United States. The population was 9,485 at the 2010 census, down from 10,036 at the 2000 census. It is a part of Ridley Township, and children residing within the community generally attend schools in the Ridley School District. Woodlyn is served by the Woodlyn Fire Co. for fire, rescue and EMS services.

Geography

Woodlyn is located in the western part of Ridley Township. It is bordered to the northeast by the Folsom part of Ridley Township, to the east by the borough of Ridley Park, to the south by the borough of Eddystone, to the southwest by the city of Chester, to the west by Nether Providence Township, and to the north by Springfield Township and the borough of Swarthmore. Interstate 476 (the Blue Route) and Interstate 95 intersect in the southern part of Woodlyn.

Demographics

At the 2000 census there were 10,036 people, 3,960 households, and 2,637 families in the CDP. The population density was 6,100.8 people per square mile (2,348.4/km). There were 4,132 housing units at an average density of 2,511.8/sq mi (966.9/km).  The racial makeup of the CDP was 87.88% White, 9.15% African American, 0.15% Native American, 1.18% Asian, 0.07% Pacific Islander, 0.34% from other races, and 1.24% from two or more races. Hispanic or Latino of any race were 1.38%.

There were 3,960 households, 30.9% had children under the age of 18 living with them, 48.4% were married couples living together, 14.0% had a female householder with no husband present, and 33.4% were non-families. 28.9% of households were made up of individuals, and 13.5% were one person aged 65 or older. The average household size was 2.53 and the average family size was 3.16.

The age distribution was 25.6% under the age of 18, 7.4% from 18 to 24, 29.8% from 25 to 44, 20.4% from 45 to 64, and 16.8% 65 or older. The median age was 38 years. For every 100 females, there were 92.1 males. For every 100 females age 18 and over, there were 86.3 males.

The median household income was $42,639 and the median family income  was $49,590. Males had a median income of $40,066 versus $28,163 for females. The per capita income for the CDP was $20,899. About 8.9% of families and 11.8% of the population were below the poverty line, including 17.4% of those under age 18 and 12.5% of those age 65 or over.

Notable people
 Rocco J. Carzo, football coach
 George Trosley, cartoonist

References

Census-designated places in Delaware County, Pennsylvania
Census-designated places in Pennsylvania